Parinui is a small Māori community in New Zealand, based around the Mangatiti Stream on the middle reaches of the Whanganui River. The area, including the neighbouring settlement of Tieke Kāinga, is popular with tourists.

The community has four marae, used as meeting places by local Māori:
 Mangapapapa Marae Te Oranga Wairua meeting house, belonging to Ngāti Kaponga / Taumata Māhoe
 Onepoto Marae, belonging to Ngāti Paku
 Papatupu Marae, belonging to Ngāti Uenuku
 Parinui Pā and Kare o Ngā Putiputi o Io meeting house, belonging to Ngāti Rūrū

References

Populated places in Manawatū-Whanganui
Settlements on the Whanganui River